EDG may refer to:

Science and medicine 
 Electron donating group, a category in chemistry
 Electrodermograph, a measuring device for skin
 Elevational diversity gradient, an ecological pattern
 Endothelial differentiation gene, a family of integral membrane proteins
 Esophagogastroduodenoscopy, a diagnostic procedure

Transport 
 Eden Gardens railway station, in Kolkata, India
 Edge Hill railway station, in Liverpool, England
 Weide Army Airfield, in Maryland, United States

Other uses 
 Edison Design Group, an American software company
 Edward Gaming, a Chinese esports organization
 Emergency diesel generator, an independent source of electrical power
 European Democrats, a party group in the European Parliament
 European Democrat Group, a party group in the Council of Europe